Faculty awards are given to faculty in recognition of outstanding contributions in research, teaching, and/or service to their university, students, profession, or field.

See also
Faculty (academic staff)
Higher education
University
 List of education awards

References

External links 
Center for Measuring University Performance
Faculty Awards and University Ranking, Florida State University
IBM University Awards
The Thomas Ehrlich Civically Engaged Faculty Award 
Vanderbilt University Faculty Awards
Young Faculty Award (DARPA)
Young Faculty Award (IITM)

Academic terminology